Ian Barry Mune  (born 1941) is a New Zealand character actor, director, and screenwriter. His screen acting career spans four decades and more than 50 roles. His work as a film director includes hit comedy Came a Hot Friday, an adaptation of classic New Zealand play The End of the Golden Weather, and What Becomes of the Broken Hearted?, the sequel to Once Were Warriors.

Early life and family
Mune was born in Auckland, and educated at Wesley College in the same city. He was married to the writer Josie Mune until her death in 2015.

Acting
Mune acted on stage while training to be a teacher in Wellington. After time acting in the UK, he returned to his native New Zealand and won a Feltex award in 1975 after starring in one-off television drama Derek. Another award followed for playing Leo Moynihan, the secretary of a trade union in television series Moynihan. In 1987 he appeared in the TVNZ documentary mini-series Erebus: The Aftermath for which he won the award for Best Male in a Dramatic Role.

In 1994 Mune won another New Zealand television award after playing Prime Minister Sir Robert Muldoon in television mini-series Fallout, which depicted the end of the Muldoon-led National Government.

Mune featured in a documentary about the making of Shakespeare's King Lear called In The Shadow of King Lear by New Zealand company Theatre at Large giving insight into his acting process.

He has gone on to appear in a range of New Zealand feature films, including A Song of Good, Savage Honeymoon and I'm Not Harry Jenson. He  played Winston Churchill in American telemovie Ike: Countdown to D-Day, and Buster Keaton in Lucy: The Lucille Ball Story.

Mune was a support role in the Australian drama Wanted, opposite Rebecca Gibney and Robyn Malcolm that premiered in 2016.

Directing and writing
Mune took multiple creative roles on 1976 anthology series Winners and Losers, which saw him collaborating with director Roger Donaldson. The two first collaborated on Derek; Mune directed and wrote some episodes of the new series, and acted in others. Having helped script Donaldson's first feature film, dystopian thriller Sleeping Dogs, Mune also appeared on-screen alongside its star, Sam Neill.

Mune's other writing credits include adapting classic Ian Cross novel The God Boy into a well-regarded telemovie, the movie version of children's fable The Silent One, and co-writing Goodbye Pork Pie, the first New Zealand feature to win large audiences in its home country.

In 1985 he made his feature debut as a director with hit comedy Came a Hot Friday. Based around the escapades of two smalltown conmen in 50s era New Zealand, the film is based on the novel by Ronald Hugh Morrieson.

Mune won further acclaim in 1991 for directing 'coming of age' drama The End of the Golden Weather, an adaptation of parts of Bruce Mason's classic one-man play. Mune spent a number of years developing this passion project and seeking finance, working with Mason on the project before Mason died.

What Becomes of the Broken Hearted? won nine of its 13 New Zealand Film Award nominations in 1999.  The film is the sequel to hard-edged drama Once Were Warriors, which became New Zealand's most successful feature film soon after release. It remains Mune's biggest commercial success to date.

Mune's other directorial projects include a feature-length documentary on comedian (and Came a Hot Friday actor) Billy T James, teenage drama The Whole of the Moon, and UVF thriller The Grasscutter. For television, he directed episodes of comedy series Letter to Blanchy and anthology series The Ray Bradbury Theater. He was one of a large team of second unit directors on Peter Jackson's adaptation of The Lord of the Rings and played a small cameo in the first film.

In 2008 Mune directed depression-era telefeature movie Life's A Riot. Mune also had a cameo role as a judge, after the actor cast in the role did not show up.

Mune: An Autobiography was published in 2010.

Honours, awards and nominations
 2008 – Qantas Film and Television Awards - Nominated for Best Supporting Actor - Film: for A Song of Good
 2000 – Qantas Film and Television Awards - Rudall Hayward Award
 1999 – Nokia New Zealand Film Awards - Best Director: for What Becomes of the Broken Hearted?
 1998 – TV Guide Television Awards - Best Actor: for Home Movie
 1996 – TV Guide New Zealand Film and Television Awards - Best Screenplay - Film (shared with Richard Lymposs): for The Whole of the Moon
 1996 – TV Guide New Zealand Film and Television Awards -Best Supporting Actor - Television: for Cover Story, episode 3
 1996 – Giffoni International Film Festival (Children's Film Festival, Italy) - First Prize (Golden Gryphon): The Whole of the Moon
 1995 – New Zealand Film and Television Awards - Best Actor - Television: for Fallout
 1993 – CableAce Awards (United States) - Best Directing for a Dramatic Series: for The Ray Bradbury Theatre, 'Great Wide World Over There' episode
 1993 – Young Artist Awards (United States) - Outstanding Foreign Film: The End of the Golden Weather
 1992 – New Zealand Film Awards - Best Film: The End of the Golden Weather
 1992 – New Zealand Film Awards - Best Director: for The End of the Golden Weather
 1992 – Giffoni International Film Festival - First Prize (Golden Gryphon): The End of the Golden Weather
 1991 – Appointed an Officer of the Order of the British Empire, for services to film and theatre, in the 1991 New Year Honours
 1988 – Listener Film and Television Awards - Best Male Performance in a Dramatic Role - Television: for Erebus: The Aftermath
 1986 – National Mutual GOFTA Awards - Best Film: Came a Hot Friday
 1986 – National Mutual GOFTA Awards - Best Director - Film: for Came a Hot Friday
 1986 – National Mutual GOFTA Awards - Best Screenplay Adaptation - Film (shared with Dean Parker): for Came a Hot Friday
 1981 – Feltex Television Awards (New Zealand) - Best Script (with John Banas): for Little Big Man Takes a Shot at the Moon
 1979 – Feltex Television Awards - Best Drama: The Mad Dog Gang Meets Rotten Fred and Ratsguts
 1977 – Feltex Television Awards - Best Actor: for Winners and Losers and Moynihan
 1977 – Feltex Television Awards - Best Script: The God Boy
 1976 – Feltex Television Awards - Best Script (shared with Peter Hansard): for The Woman at the Store
 1976 – Feltex Television Awards - Nominated for Best Actor: The Woman at the Store
 1975 – Feltex Television Awards - Best Drama: Derek
 1975 – Feltex Television Awards - Best Actor: for Derek

See also 
 Cinema of New Zealand

References

External links
 
 Ian's Profile and screenography on NZ On Screen

1941 births
Living people
New Zealand male film actors
New Zealand male television actors
New Zealand film directors
New Zealand theatre directors
People educated at Wesley College, Auckland
New Zealand Officers of the Order of the British Empire
Māori-language film directors